"You Never Love the Same Way Twice" is a song by Zambian-born singer Rozalla, released in October 1994 as the third single from her second album, Look No Further (1995). It was later also included on her Best Of album. The song reached number 12 on the Scottish Singles Chart and number 16 on the UK Singles Chart, during a five-week chart run. It was a minor hit in Germany and Iceland, and peaked at number 61 on the Eurochart Hot 100 in November 1994. The single was also released in the United States in 1995 as the attendant single of the US edition of her second album, reaching number 11 on the Billboard Hot Dance Club Play chart. In 2005, Rozalla re-recorded and re-released the track for a German label.

Critical reception
Larry Flick from Billboard described "You Never Love the Same Way Twice" as "slammin'", and a "disco bauble that tingles with lush strings and a vocal that is commanding without flying out of control." He complimented Rozalla's voice as a "warm, soulful quality that brings this disco-drenched house mover to vibrant life." He concluded with that "this could be the start of Rozalla's long-deserved ascension into the pop spotlight." In his UK chart commentary, James Masterton felt it is "a far more impressive piece of pop dance" than "This Time I Found Love". Alan Jones from Music Week rated it three out of five, and noted that "she seems to be back on the right track with this smart urban/house song". Tim Jeffery from the RM Dance Update stated, "Probably her best single since signing to a major", declaring it "a likely hit." Another editor, James Hamilton, viewed it as an "attractive ditty".

Track listing
 CD maxi, UK and Europe (1994)
"You Never Love the Same Way Twice" (Single Version) — 4:06
"You Never Love the Same Way Twice" (Classic Paradise Radio Mix) — 3:41
"You Never Love the Same Way Twice" (Soulpower Mix) — 5:49
"You Never Love the Same Way Twice" (Soulpower Hip Hop Mix) — 5:11
"You Never Love the Same Way Twice" (Extended Mix) — 8:27

Charts

References

1994 singles
1994 songs
Epic Records singles
Rozalla songs
Song recordings produced by Rick Nowels
Songs written by Rick Nowels